Josef Myrow (February 18, 1910 – December 24, 1987 in Los Angeles, California) was a Russian Empire-born composer, known for his work in film scores in the 1940s and 1950s.  He was twice nominated for an Academy Award: in 1947 for the song "You Do" from the film Mother Wore Tights and in 1950 for "Wilhelmina" from the film Wabash Avenue.  Both songs were written with Mack Gordon. Other notable compositions include "Autumn Nocturne" (with Kim Gannon) and "You Make Me Feel So Young" (again with Mack Gordon).

He also wrote, with Robert Mills, "C A P Is on the Go", the official song of the Civil Air Patrol, the United States Air Force Auxiliary.

He died from the effects of Parkinson's disease, In late 1987.

References

External links

Allmovie bio
 LA Times obituary (26 December 1987)

1910 births
1987 deaths
People from Los Angeles
American composers
Emigrants from the Russian Empire to the United States